Karl Otto Kassulke (March 20, 1941 – October 27, 2008) was a professional American football player.

Kassulke graduated from Drake, where he starred as a safety. He played 10 seasons in the National Football League, all with the Minnesota Vikings. Kassulke started in Super Bowl IV, where he and teammate Earsell Mackbee missed a tackle on Otis Taylor on the final touchdown of the game, late in the third quarter. The next season, he was selected to the Pro Bowl.

On July 24, 1973, Kassulke suffered a motorcycle accident on the way to training camp that left him paralyzed from the waist down.

After his playing career, Kassulke worked with Wings Outreach, a Christian Ministry to the disabled.

Kassulke was immortalized in NFL lore by NFL Films' official highlight film for Super Bowl IV. Kansas City Chiefs coach Hank Stram, who was wired for sound by NFL Films executive producer Ed Sabol, noted the confusion in the Vikings' defense due to the Chiefs' shifting offense and quipped, "Kassulke was running around there like it was a Chinese fire drill".

References

External links
Obituary in St. Paul Pioneer Press

American football defensive backs
Drake Bulldogs football players
Minnesota Vikings players
National Conference Pro Bowl players
People with paraplegia
Players of American football from Milwaukee
1941 births
2008 deaths